Sharpening is the process of creating or refining the edge joining two non-coplanar faces into a converging apex, thereby creating an edge of appropriate shape on a tool or implement designed for cutting. Sharpening is done by removing material on an implement with an abrasive substance harder than the material of the implement, followed sometimes by processes to polish/hone the sharp surface to increase smoothness.

Tools and materials

There are many ways of sharpening tools. Malleable metal surfaces such as bronze, iron and mild steel may be formed by beating or peening a flat surface into a sharp edge. This process also causes work hardening.

An abrasive material may be rubbed against the cutting edge to be sharpened. The most traditional abrasive material is a natural stone such as sandstone or granite.
Modern synthetic grinding wheels and flat sharpening stones can be manufactured in precise grades of abrasiveness according to the intended process. A sharp edge may be 'dressed' using a Honing steel

The substance on the sharpening surface must be harder (hardness is measured on the Mohs scale) than the material being sharpened; diamond is extremely hard, making diamond dust very effective for sharpening, though expensive; less costly, but less hard, abrasives are available, such as synthetic and natural Japanese waterstones. Several cutlery manufacturers now offer electric knife sharpeners with multiple stages with at least one grinding stage. These electric sharpeners are typically used in the kitchen but have the ability to sharpen blades such as pocket or tactical knives. The main benefit of using an electric sharpener is speed with many models that can complete the sharpening process in one to two minutes. The disadvantage is that the sharpening angle is fixed so some specialized knives, like a Japanese style Santoku, may need additional attention to sharpen to the ideal angle.

Angles

Very sharp knives sharpen at about 10 dps (degrees per side) (which implies that the knife's edge has an included angle of 20-degrees). Generally speaking, razors, paring knives, and fillet knives should be the sharpest  knives at an angle of 12° – 18°. Most kitchen knives, like utility/slicing knives, chef's knives, boning knives, carving knives, should be sharpened to 15° – 25°.  The exceptions are Japanese style knives that are usually sharpened to 14° – 16° depending on the knife maker.  Japanese style knives utilize a much harder steel, and are therefore more brittle than their Western style counterparts.  This means care should be taken when handling these knives as they are susceptible to chipping and breaking.  The sporting knife category, including pocket knives, survival knives, and hunting knives, sees more intense action and should be sharpened to the 25° – 30° angle range.  The less sharp angle means there is more metal there to cut, thus providing more durability out in the field.  For an extremely durable edge, a machete, chisel, drawknife or ax should be sharpened down to 30° – 40° providing even more ruggedness and longer lasting sharpness.

The sharpness is measured at the microscopic level where the face of your implement may have an angle however at the convergence of the two angles is a joining point called the "Apex".

Straight edges

Many implements have a cutting edge which is essentially straight. Knives, chisels, straight-edge razors, and scissors are examples. Sharpening a straight edge is relatively simple, and can be done by using either a simple sharpening device which is very easy to use but will not produce the best possible results, or by the skillful use of oil or water grinding stones, grinding wheels, hones, etc.

Sharpening these implements can be expressed as the creation of two intersecting planes which produce an edge that is sharp enough to cut through the target material. For example, the blade of a steel knife is ground to a bevel so that the two sides of the blade meet. This edge is then refined by honing until the blade is capable of cutting.

The extent to which this honing takes place depends upon the intended use of the tool or implement. For some applications an edge with a certain amount of jaggedness is acceptable, or even desirable, as this creates a serrated cutting edge. In other applications the edge must be as smooth as possible.

Steeling 

Sharpening straight edges (knives, chisels, etc.) by hand can be divided into phases. First the edge is sharpened with an abrasive sharpening stone, or a succession of increasingly fine stones, which shape the blade by removing material; the finer the abrasive the finer the finish. Then the edge may be stropped by polishing the edge with a fine abrasive such as rouge or tripoli on a piece of stout leather or canvas. The edge may be steeled or honed by passing the blade against a hard metal or ceramic "steel" which plastically deforms and straightens the material of the blade's edge which may have been rolled over irregularly in use, but not enough to need complete resharpening.

Stoning

Other edges

Different techniques are required where the edges are not straight. Special tools and skills are more often required, and sharpening is often best done by a specialist rather than the user of the tool.

Examples include:
 Drill bits - twist drills used for wood or steel are usually sharpened on a grinding wheel or within a purpose made grinding jig to an angle of 60° from vertical (120° total) although sharper angles may be used for hard or brittle materials such as glass.
 Saws have teeth, typically splayed from the blade so that the cutting edge removes enough material to allow the whole blade to pass freely through the cleft material. Usually only the leading edge of the saw blade is sharpened.

Mobile sharpening service

A number of blade sharpeners operate a mobile business, traveling to their customers locations, often in highly equipped vehicles.

Less common in developed nations. Still very common in many areas of the world, skilled craftsmen provide a roadside sharpening service for kitchen knives and cleavers, scissors, and sometimes other blades.

They commonly have a 'round' which may include trades such as butchers or barbers some of whom, in addition to using the service for their own tools may act as 'agents' collecting instruments for the general public.

Sharpeners may also have regular 'stops' in busy streets or residential areas, calling out to people from their homes or businesses using musical instruments such as handbells or pipes.

The sharpener usually has some sort of mobile work bench with a grinding wheel which may be powered by hand, using a bicycle mechanism or electric motor.

As well as coarse grinding, sharpeners also typically 'dress' the cutting edges with a sharpening stone or honing steel, secure or replace loose handles and generally offer advice and assistance regarding best practice. Some also sell knives and related products.

Modern mobile sharpening services will travel in a Van or Bus and have a workshop inside that allows them to service the edges of different various tools and instruments.  There are two major forms of sharpening or sharpeners where you sharpen as a hobbyist and "make it work" or you are a craftsman that strives to learn different styles of sharpening and how they perform under different applications.

See also
 Blade
 Grinding machine
 Knife sharpening
 Razor strop
 Saw set
 Scary sharp
 Sharpening jig
 Sharpening stone

References

John Pool - Craftsman Sharpener and Artisan of Shears and Cutlery - http://www.Battlebornbladesharpening.com

External links 
A Guide to Honing and Sharpening
John Pool - Craftsman Sharpener | Artisan of Shears and Cutlery - Battle Born Blade Sharpening

 
Woodcarving
Woodworking tools
Woodworking techniques
Articles containing video clips